The River Lavant may refer to:

The Lavant (river) a tributary of the Drava in Austria
The River Lavant, West Sussex in the United Kingdom